Ryan Khatam (born 1982) is an American animator and storyboard artist. He has worked on Metalocalypse and MTV's Good Vibes. He was also a storyboard artist for two 2014 episodes of Breadwinners. He worked as an animator on the Gecko & Sticky segment of Shredderman Rules and on Baton (バトン, directed by Ryuhei Kitamura). Khatam  also worked as an animator on Black Panther and TripTank. In 2013 he worked on the Kickstarter-funded feature film Dick Figures: The Movie. In November 2014 he launched his own Kickstarter for Johnny Rocketfingers 3.

History
Khatam began animating at the age of 14. His first animation was very crude, using a basic stick figure. He studied animation at Rancho Bernardo High School, Palomar College, Los Angeles Academy of Figurative Art, and The Animation Academy. His first freelance job was to animate deaths for Gorilla 2: The Return, the sequel to Gorillas. He was then contacted by Conspiracy Games to create a sequel to his own Johnny Rocketfingers. As of November 2014, this sequel, Johnny Rocketfingers 2, has been viewed more than 4.5 million times.

References

External links
 Cracked Animations
 Ryan Khatam's first blog and second blog at Blogger
 

1984 births
American animators
American storyboard artists
Living people